Strident  refers to

Linguistics
 Strident vowel
 Strident consonant, a feature related to sibilant consonants, but also including labiodental and uvular fricatives.

Others